Nilus is a genus of nursery web spiders that was first described by Octavius Pickard-Cambridge in 1876.

Species
 it contains eighteen species, found only in Africa, Asia, and India:
Nilus albocinctus (Doleschall, 1859) – India to Philippines
Nilus curtus O. Pickard-Cambridge, 1876 (type) – Africa
Nilus decorata (Patel & Reddy, 1990) – India
Nilus esimoni (Sierwald, 1984) – Madagascar
Nilus jayakari (F. O. Pickard-Cambridge, 1898) – Oman
Nilus kolosvaryi (Caporiacco, 1947) – Central, East, Southern Africa
Nilus leoninus (Strand, 1916) – Madagascar
Nilus majungensis (Strand, 1907) – Mayotte, Madagascar
Nilus margaritatus (Pocock, 1898) – Central, South Africa
Nilus massajae (Pavesi, 1883) – Africa
Nilus paralbocinctus (Zhang, Zhu & Song, 2004) – China, Laos
Nilus phipsoni (F. O. Pickard-Cambridge, 1898) – India to China, Indonesia
Nilus pictus (Simon, 1898) – West, Central Africa
Nilus pseudoalbocinctus (Sen, Saha & Raychaudhuri, 2010) – India
Nilus pseudojuvenilis (Sierwald, 1987) – Mozambique
Nilus radiatolineatus (Strand, 1906) – Africa
Nilus rossi (Pocock, 1902) – Central, South Africa
Nilus rubromaculatus (Thorell, 1899) – West, Central Africa

See also
 List of Pisauridae species

References

Araneomorphae genera
Pisauridae
Spiders of Africa
Spiders of Asia
Spiders of Australia
Taxa named by Octavius Pickard-Cambridge